The Women's 400m event at the 2010 South American Games was held on March 20 at 18:30.

Medalists

Records

Results
Results were published.

Final

See also
2010 South American Under-23 Championships in Athletics

References

External links
Heat 1

400W